Borgholzhausen is a town in the district of Gütersloh in the state of North Rhine-Westphalia, Germany. It is located in the Teutoburg Forest, approx. 20 km north-west of Bielefeld.

Borgholzhausen is a sister city to New Haven, Missouri in the Missouri Rhineland of the United States.

Geography and early history 
Borgholzhausen liegt inmitten einer Lichtung im Teutoburger Wald, am Nordrand der Westfälischen Tiefebene. Die Bergkette halbiert das Stadtgebiet ungefähr in NW-SO und wird wiederum durch den Gebirgspass halbiert, an dem die Stadt Borgholzhausen gegründet wurde. Der gebirgige Teil des Borgholzhausen-Gebiets erreicht im Allgemeinen Höhen von 200–300 Metern über dem Meeresspiegel, während das Passgebiet und andere tiefer gelegene Teile weniger als die Hälfte dieser Höhe aufweisen.

Das Ortszentrum liegt etwa einen Kilometer östlich des Berges Johannisegge und südlich des Berges Hankenüll. So liegen die nördlichen Teile von Borgholzhausen in den Ravensberger Bergen, während der Süden im Münsterland liegt. Das Grundgestein im ersteren Teil ist eine dicke Schicht hauptsächlich aus kreidezeitlichen Sedimenten, während der letztere eine weniger dicke Schicht aus allgemein mesozoischen Gesteinen aufweist, die den Rumpf einer paläozoischen Bergkette bedeckt.

Der Pass Borgholzhausen war in der Bronzezeit ein wichtiger Weg zur Überquerung des Teutoburger Waldes. Bereits 1.500 v. Chr. war das Passgebiet flächendeckend besiedelt. Zahlreiche Urnenfelderfriedhöfe wurden in und um die Stadt ausgegraben.

Town divisions 
 Barnhausen
 Berghausen
 Borgholzhausen
 Casum
 Cleve
 Hamlingdorf
 Holtfeld
 Kleekamp
 Oldendorf
 Ostbarthausen
 Westbarthausen
 Wichlinghausen

Church 
The Protestant Church dates back to the 14th century and features a stone-carved altar from around 1500.

References 

Borgholzhausen